Alexander O'Neal is the debut solo studio album by American recording artist Alexander O'Neal. It was originally released in 1985 by Tabu and Epic. The songs were recorded during 1984 to 1985 in sessions that took place at Creation Audio in Minnesota, and Larrabee Sound in Los Angeles, California, assisted by R&B songwriting and record production team Jimmy Jam and Terry Lewis.

After release, the album was received favourably by the majority of music critics. One of O'Neal's most commercially successful solo albums, in the United States it went on to peak at number 92 on the Billboard 200 and number 21 on Top R&B/Hip-Hop Albums. The album launched four charting singles in the United Kingdom. "If You Were Here Tonight" peaked at number 13 on the UK Singles Chart; "A Broken Heart Can Mend" peaked at number 53; "What's Missing" at number 90; "You Were Meant to Be My Lady (Not My Girl)" at number 98. In the UK, the album sold more than 100,000 copies and was certified gold by the BPI.

The album was re-released on 8 April 2013 on Tabu's new Re-born imprint featuring rare bonus content. The reissue is a 2-CD set with the original album digitally remastered from the original 1/2" mix tapes; the bonus content consists of associated 7", and 12" mixes.

Critical reception
Alexander O'Neal was well received by most critics. In his consumer guide for The Village Voice, Robert Christgau gave the album a B and commented that "From the Timexes who gave the world the new improved S.O.S. Band, a new improved black matinee idol. They start one side with a can't-miss post-vulnerable ballad, the other with a can't-miss dance song deceptively entitled "Innocent". He then added: "The rest they leave to craft. Is this any way to serve a new improved matinee idol? Probably."

Today, the album is still viewed in a positive light by critics some three decades later. Alex Henderson of AllMusic gave the album four and a half out of five stars and wrote that "Creatively and commercially, the soul man hit the ground running with this impressive debut album", adding that "Excellent from start to finish, Alexander O'Neal is the singer's most essential album."

Track listing
All songs written and composed by James Harris and Terry Lewis, except where noted.

Side one
"A Broken Heart Can Mend" – 3:45
"If You Were Here Tonight" (Monte Moir) – 6:11
"Do You Wanna Like I Do" (Monte Moir) – 4:50
"Look at Us Now" (Monte Moir) – 5:07

Side two
Medley: "Innocent"/"Alex 9000"/"Innocent II" – 10:32
"What's Missing" – 5:43
"You Were Meant to Be My Lady (Not My Girl)" – 6:31

Personnel
Credits are adapted from the album's liner notes.
 Alexander O'Neal – lead vocals, backing vocals
 Jimmy Jam – synthesizer, synthesizer programming, acoustic piano, drum programming, percussion, backing vocals,
 Terry Lewis – bass guitar, guitar, percussion, drum programming, synthesizers, backing vocals
 Monte Moir – synthesizer, synthesizer programming, acoustic piano, drum programming, percussion, backing vocals
 Jellybean Johnson – drums, percussion, guitar solo
 Additional personnel
 David Eiland – saxophone
 O'Nicholas Raths – guitar 
 John Della Selva – guitar
 Bobby Schnitzer – guitar
 Thomas Organ – guitar
 Marcus Wise – tablas, bion
 Cherrelle – backing vocals
 Lucia Newell – backing vocals
 Gwendolyn Traylor – backing vocals
 Denise Saenz – backing vocals
Technical
 Steve Wiese, Randy Tominaga, Fred Howard, Jack Daly – recording engineers
 Steve Hodge, Fred Howard – mixing
 Brian Gardner – mastering

Charts

Peak positions
Original release

Sales and certifications

Release history

References

External links
 Alexander O'Neal at Discogs

1985 debut albums
Alexander O'Neal albums
Albums produced by Jimmy Jam and Terry Lewis
Tabu Records albums
Epic Records albums